The 1968 Louisville Cardinals football team was an American football team that represented the University of Louisville in the Missouri Valley Conference (MVC) during the 1968 NCAA University Division football season. In their 23rd and final season under head coach Frank Camp, the Cardinals compiled a 5–5 record (2–3 against conference opponents) and were outscored by a total of 233 to 192.

The team's statistical leaders included QB Wally Oyler completing 46.7% of passes for 1,410 passing yards and 19 interceptions. RB Herbie Phelps with 468 rushing yards (4.9 yards per carry) and 36 points scored.  TE Rick Getch and WR Larry Hart each had 25 receptions for 315 and 375 yards respectively.

Schedule

References

Louisville
Louisville Cardinals football seasons
Louisville Cardinals football